The Marijuana Party fielded eight candidates in the 2008 federal election :

 Moffat, Michael (Radical Marijuana) - Saint John 
 Longley, Blair T. (Radical Marijuana) - Hochelaga
 Parker, Terry (Radical Marijuana) - Parkdale—High Park
 Akpata, John Andrew (Radical Marijuana) - Ottawa Centre
 Klevering, Kornelis (Radical Marijuana) - Guelph
 Rathwell, Ernest Oliver (Radical Marijuana) - Lanark—Frontenac—Lennox and Addington
 Carrière, Denis Andrew (Radical Marijuana) - Thunder Bay—Superior North
 Felger, Tim (Radical Marijuana) - Abbotsford

The results were as follows:
 8 Candidates; 2,319 total votes.
 Average votes: 0.59% per Candidate.
 Of total vote: 0.017% of national votes.

See also 
 Marijuana Party candidates in the 2006 Canadian federal election
 Marijuana Party candidates in the 2011 Canadian federal election

References

2008
Candidates in the 2008 Canadian federal election